ENIT—Agenzia nazionale del turismo, known in English as The Italian Government Tourist Board, formerly the Ente Nazionale Italiano per il Turismo ('Italian National Agency for Tourism') is the Italian national tourism board. The national Tourist Board is situated in Rome.

History 
It was founded in 1919 under the Liberal-Radical government of Francesco Saverio Nitti. Following the transformation ordered by the 2005 regulation, the ENIT-Italian National Tourism Agency took over, with increased and more articulated institutional responsibilities, an almost one-hundred-year activity of the Italian National Tourist Board. In 2014 ENIT was transformed into a public economic body.

ENIT is responsible for the promoting tourism in Italy.

Notes

References
 
 Taina Syrjäma, Visitez l'Italie : Italian state tourist propaganda abroad 1919-1943: administrative structure and practical realization, 1997 in Turun yliopiston julkaisuja/Annales Universitatis Turkuensis Series B, Humaniora, 217.  (not seen)

External links
 Official site

Tourism agencies
Tourism in Italy
Government agencies of Italy
1919 establishments in Italy